On 3 August 2021 the asphalt tanker Asphalt Princess, travelling from Khor Fakkan, the United Arab Emirates, to the Sohar, Oman, was attacked and boarded in the Gulf of Oman. The ship is flagged in Panama. The vessel is owned by Glory International, listed as based in the Emirati free zone.

The hijackers were allegedly backed by Iran. Shipping near in the Gulf of Oman were advised to exercise “extreme caution” by the United Kingdom Maritime Trade Operations (UKMTO) earlier in the day.

The attack was preceded by three similar maritime incidents in May 2019, June 2019 and July 2021.

Incident
On 3 August 2021, four oil tankers called Queen Ematha, Golden Brilliant, Jag Pooja, and Abyss, sailing in the Gulf of Oman, announced around the same time that they were “not under command."

At 04:44 UTC on 4 August, UKMTO released an update declaring the incident a “potential hijacking”, where a group of eight or nine armed individuals were believed to have boarded the vessel without authorisation and ordered the ship to sail to Iran.

At 05:32 UTC on 4 August, the UKMTO reported that the boarders had left the vessel and that the vessel was safe, signifying an end to the incident.

At 07:26 UTC on 4 August, Al Jazeera reported on Twitter that the Iranian Armed Forces claimed to be "providing assistance and security for merchant ships" and were ready to send “relief units” to the vessel.

Reactions
Iran denied having any role in the incident. The Iranian Foreign Ministry said on August 3 that the recent maritime attacks in the Persian Gulf were "completely suspicious", while an armed forces spokesman dismissed reports of the incident as "psychological warfare".

Oman confirmed the hijacking of the Asphalt Princess in a statement on 4 August, and the Sultanate's Navy said it deployed several ships to the Gulf of Oman "to help secure international waters."

See also
 July 2021 Gulf of Oman incident
 2022 Iran–Greece naval incident

References

2021 in Oman
Attacks in Asia in 2021
August 2021 events in Asia
August 2021 incident
Iran–United States military relations
Maritime incidents in 2021